= Stack Jump =

2017 video game

- Developer: Voodoo
- Platforms: iOS; Android
- Release: July 27, 2017
- Genre: Action

Stack Jump is an action video game developed by French studio Voodoo and released for mobile on July 27, 2017.

== Gameplay ==
The game's goal is to tap the screen to make the character jump and land on blocks oncoming from the sides to stack them, gathering points for every successful jump, and climb as high as the player can, avoiding the character to be hit by a block, which ends the level. Perfectly stacking a block lined up with the previous block increases the points awarded by jump.

There are currently 39 different characters that can be unlocked by playing.

Apart from the endless game mode, there other 4 modes that have specific characteristics and require the player to reach a certain height to finish, and are subdivided in 12 levels that increase the difficulty and height. "Underwater" slows the down the speed of your jump; "High speed" increases the speed of the oncoming blocks; "Perfect jumps" requires that the player perfectly lines up all blocks until the end of the level; and "Fireball" makes a fireball come from the sides at each jump and the player must jump over it.

== Design ==
The game has simplistic 3D graphics with small stylized characters. There are several different background themes (which also change the appearance of the blocks) that can be chosen along with the characters, apart from the preset and unchangeable themes that the different game modes have. There are multiple characters/monsters that can be used for gameplay, and the blocks change color for every play.

Some characters have their own background themes (for instance, the Frankenstein's monster character is set in a graveyard with graveyard-themed blocks), but the background theme can still be changed.

== Reception ==
The game has been overall complimented by reviewers for the simple gameplay which makes learning how to play easier, overall low difficulty and friendly graphics. It is considered an addictive casual arcade game, but is often remarked to have it harmed due to lack of replay value.

Reviewers, however, criticized it for the invasive advertisement pop-ups and the abusiveness of the price to remove them.
